El Tajín National Airport  is an international airport located in Tihuatlán, Veracruz, Mexico, near Poza Rica. The airport is named after the archeological site of El Tajín. It handles commercial air traffic for the cities of Poza Rica and Túxpam. Aeropuertos y Servicios Auxiliares, a federal government-owned corporation, operates the airport.

In 2021, the airport handled 2,645 passengers, and in 2022 it handled 2,666 passengers.

Statistics

Passengers

See also 

List of the busiest airports in Mexico

References

External links
 Poza Rica Intl. Airport

Airports in Veracruz